Umdoni Bird Sanctuary is  situated in Amanzimtoti, KwaZulu-Natal in South Africa.  The sanctuary is often simply referred to as The Bird Park by locals or as Amanzimtoti Bird Sanctuary.  The area is roughly 4 ha of land including a dam on a tributary of the Amanzimtoti River. There are picnic areas and forest trails.

A kilometer-long trail runs through the sanctuary. There are three hides on the trail from which visitors can watch some of the 150 species of birds that inhabit the sanctuary.  The sanctuary is home to large flocks of Spur-winged geese and White-faced ducks. The sanctuary was also home to the southernmost breeding pair of Palm-nut vultures in 2009. Narina trogons are also often sighted here and the endangered Spotted ground-thrush has been seen.

Blue duiker and endangered Cape clawless otters frequent the sanctuary.

Gallery

Bird sanctuaries of South Africa
Tourist attractions in Durban
Protected areas of KwaZulu-Natal